The 990s BC is a decade which lasted from 999 BC to 990 BC.

Events and trends
 998 BC—King David establishes Jerusalem as the capital of the Kingdom of Israel.
 994 BC—Archippus, Archon of Athens dies after a reign of 19 years and is succeeded by his son Thersippus.
 993 BC—Amenemope succeeds Psusennes I as king of Egypt.

Significant people
 Tiglath-Pileser II, king of Assyria, is born (approximate date).
 Solomon, king of Israel, is born (approximate date).

References 

 

es:Años 990 a. C.
pt:990 a.C.